Kamta Prasad Guru (1875 – 16 November 1947) was an expert on grammar of Hindi language. He was the author of the book Hindi vyakarana. He was born in Sagar, which is today in Madhya Pradesh state in India. His Hindi grammar book has been translated into many foreign languages. Kamta Prasad Guru died in Jabalpur. The Government of India issued a commemorative stamp in his honour in 1977.

References
K P GURU & HINDI GRAMMAR
amazon

Scholars from Madhya Pradesh
People from Sagar, Madhya Pradesh
Linguists of Hindi
1875 births
1947 deaths
People from Jabalpur
20th-century Indian linguists
Linguists in British India